The 2002 Copa dos Campeões was the third (and last) edition of the football competition held in Brazil. As in previous editions, it was carried out in a neutral field in three states in the Northeast Region (Piauí, Rio Grande do Norte and Ceará - place of the decision) and in Pará (North Region).

In the finals, Paysandu defeated Cruzeiro 3–0 on penalties after tied 5–5 on aggregate to win their first title and a place in the group stage of the 2003 Copa Libertadores.

Qualified teams

Group stage

Group A

Group B

Group C

Group D

Quarter-finals

|}

Semi-finals

|}

Finals

Tied 5–5 on aggregate, Paysandu won on penalties.

References

Copa dos Campeões
Copa dos Campeões